The North Bergen School District is a comprehensive community public school district that serves students in pre-kindergarten through twelfth grade from North Bergen, in Hudson County, New Jersey, United States.

As of the 2018–19 school year, the district, comprising seven schools, had an enrollment of 7,576 students and 581.8 classroom teachers (on an FTE basis), for a student–teacher ratio of 13.0:1.

The district is classified by the New Jersey Department of Education as being in District Factor Group "B", the second-lowest of eight groupings. District Factor Groups organize districts statewide to allow comparison by common socioeconomic characteristics of the local districts. From lowest socioeconomic status to highest, the categories are A, B, CD, DE, FG, GH, I and J.

Students from Guttenberg attend the district's high school as part of a sending/receiving relationship with the Guttenberg Public School District.

Schools
Schools in the district (with 2018–19 enrollment data from the National Center for Education Statistics) are:
Elementary schools
Franklin School (612 students; in grades 1–8)
Janet Sandstrom, Principal
Robert Fulton School (1,180; K-8)
John F. Kennedy School (529; 1–8)
Frank Bafumi, Principal
Lincoln School (1,355; PreK-8)
Nick Sacco, Principal
Horace Mann School (1,111; 1–8)
Pat Tennaro, Principal
McKinley School (334; K-8)
High school
North Bergen High School (2,376; 9–12)
Richard Locricchio, Principal

After High Tech High School moved to a new facility in Secaucus, which opened for the 2018–19 school year, the former High Tech High School campus was acquired by the North Bergen district, which plans to construct a new junior high school for grades 7-9 on the site.

Administration
Core members of the district's administration are:
Dr. George J. Solter Jr., Superintendent
Steven Somick, Business Administrator
Hugo D. Cabrera, Board Secretary

Board of education
The district's board of education, with nine members, sets policy and oversees the fiscal and educational operation of the district through its administration. As a Type II school district, the board's trustees are elected directly by voters to serve three-year terms of office on a staggered basis, with three seats up for election each year held as part of the April school election; a tenth board member is appointed to represent the sending district of Guttenberg. As one of the 13 districts statewide with school elections in April, voters also decide on passage of the annual school budget.

References

External links
North Bergen School District
 
School Data for the North Bergen School District, National Center for Education Statistics

New Jersey District Factor Group B
North Bergen, New Jersey
School districts in Hudson County, New Jersey